Norbert Phillips (9 July 1896 – 3 October 1961) was an Australian cricketer. He played seventeen first-class matches for New South Wales between 1922/23 and 1929/30.

See also
 List of New South Wales representative cricketers

References

External links
 

1896 births
1961 deaths
Australian cricketers
New South Wales cricketers
Cricketers from Sydney